These are the election results of the 2020 Sabah state election. State assembly elections were held in Sabah, Malaysia on 26 September 2020 as part of the snap elections. Results are expected to come on the same day, after 5 pm. Elected members of the legislative assembly (MLAs) will be representing their constituency from the first sitting of respective state legislative assembly to its dissolution.

The state legislature election deposit was set at RM5,000 per candidate. Similar to previous elections, the election deposit will be forfeited if the particular candidate had failed to secure at least 12.5% or one-eighth of the votes.

Full result

https://lom.agc.gov.my/ilims/upload/portal/akta/outputp/pub_20200929_PUB484.pdf

References 

2020
2020 elections in Malaysia
2020 in Malaysia
Election results in Malaysia